Robert Conny (also Cony; 1646?–1713), was an English physician.

Conny was the son of John Conny, surgeon, and twice mayor of Rochester, was born in or about 1645. He was a member of Magdalen College, Oxford, and proceeded B.A. on 8 June 1676, M.A. 3 May 1679, M.B. 2 May 1682, and M.D. 9 July 1685, on which occasion he 'denied and protested,' because the vice-chancellor caused one Bullard, of New College, to be presented LL.B. before him. In 1692 he was employed by the admiralty as physician to the sick and wounded landed at Deal. He married Frances, daughter of Richard Manley. He contributed a paper, in the form of a letter to Dr. Plot, 'On a Shower of Fishes,' to the 'Philosophical Transactions,' xx., and is said to have been a successful physician, and to have improved the practice of lithotomy. He died on 25 May 1713, at the age of sixty-eight, and was buried in Rochester Cathedral. His portrait is in the Bodleian Picture Gallery and in the lodgings of the president of Magdalen College.

References

1646 births
1713 deaths
17th-century English medical doctors
Alumni of Magdalen College, Oxford
18th-century English medical doctors